Daniel Blaisdell (January 22, 1762 – January 10, 1833) was an American teacher, farmer, politician and judge. He served as a United States representative from New Hampshire, as a member of the New Hampshire Senate and as a member of the New Hampshire House of Representatives during the early 1800s.

Early life
Born in Amesbury in the Province of Massachusetts Bay, Blaisdell was the son of Elijah and Mary (Sargent) Blaisdell. He attended the public schools and served in the American Revolutionary War from August 1776 - August 1777. After his war service, Blaisdell moved to Canaan, New Hampshire, in 1780. He taught school, engaged in agricultural pursuits and acquired some legal knowledge.

Political career
He was a member of the New Hampshire House of Representatives in 1793, 1795, and 1799 and served as a member of the Governor's council from 1803–1808. He was a moderator of Canaan in 1808, 1809, 1812, 1822, 1824, 1826, and 1830.

Elected as a Federalist candidate to the United States House of Representatives, he served in the Eleventh Congress from March 4, 1809 – March 3, 1811. After leaving Congress, he served in the War of 1812. He again being a member of the New Hampshire House of Representatives, and served in that capacity during 1812, 1813, 1824, and 1825. He served as selectman of Canaan in 1813, 1815, and 1818. He resumed his agricultural pursuits, and was a member of the New Hampshire Senate in 1814 and 1815. He served as Chief Justice of the court of sessions in 1822.

Death
Blaisdell died in Canaan, Grafton County, New Hampshire, on January 10, 1833, less than two weeks before his 71st birthday. He is interred at Wells Cemetery in Canaan.

Family life
On January 19, 1782, Blaisdell married Sally Springer and they had nine sons and three daughters, including Johnathan, Timothy, Parritt, and Elijah.

References

External links

1762 births
1833 deaths
People from Amesbury, Massachusetts
People of New Hampshire in the American Revolution
People from Canaan, New Hampshire
Members of the New Hampshire House of Representatives
New Hampshire state senators
United States Army personnel of the War of 1812
Federalist Party members of the United States House of Representatives from New Hampshire